The Quebec rockslide occurred on September 19, 1889, after a day of heavy rain in Quebec City, Canada.  An overhanging piece of slate rock broke off from Cap Diamant and fell 90 metres (300 feet) onto the houses below. The homes of 28 families on Champlain Street were crushed, burying roughly 100 people under 24 metres (80 feet) of broken slate rock. The final death toll exceeded 40 people.

Gallery

Footnotes

References
SOS! Canadian Disasters, a virtual museum exhibition at Library and Archives Canada

History of Quebec City
Natural disasters in Quebec
1889 in Quebec
Landslides in Canada
Landslides in 1889